Étang d'Aureilhan or Lac d'Aureilhan is a lake at Aureilhan in the Landes department, France. At an elevation of 10 m, its surface area is 3.4 km².

External links

Aureilhan
Landforms of Landes (department)